Shari Arison (born ) is an American-born Israeli businesswoman and philanthropist. She is the owner of Arison Investments, which consists of several business companies, and of The Ted Arison Family Foundation, which comprises several philanthropic organizations that operate as its subsidiaries. She was the controlling shareholder of Bank Hapoalim for 21 years, and after selling some of her shares in November 2018, she ceased to be the controlling shareholder at the bank. She was also an owner of Shikun & Binui for 22 years, sold to the Saidoff Group on August 6, 2018.

As of 2007, according to Forbes, she is the richest woman in the Middle East, and the only woman to be ranked in the region's top-20 of the richest people in 2007. As of November 2021, Forbes estimated her fortune at US$4.6 billion, making her the 590th-wealthiest person in the world, and the fourth-wealthiest in Israel.

Biography
Arison was born in New York City, and is the daughter of the businessman Ted Arison and Mina Arison Sapir. She has an older brother, Micky. In 1966 her parents divorced, and she moved to Israel to live with her mother. At the age of 12 she returned to the US to live with her father, and five years later she returned to Israel in order to enlist in the Israel Defense Forces. In 1999 Arison's father died, and bequeathed her 35% of his possessions.

In 2003, she was the target of protests after 900 workers were fired from Bank Hapoalim.

In March 2009, Arison sponsored Israel's third annual "Good Deeds Day" in which her non-profit organization, Ruach Tova, inspired thousands of Israelis to get involved in volunteering across the country. As part of the event, which took place near Tel Aviv, a Palestinian youth orchestra performed in an hour-long concert in honor of Holocaust survivors. They played classical Arabic tunes and songs of peace, but upon the group's return to Jenin, local Arab authorities condemned the orchestra's leader for her "exploitation of the children for political purposes." The event garnered worldwide media attention. Following the concert to celebrate "Good Deeds Day", the orchestra conductor was expelled from her hometown of Jenin.

Arison was awarded the America–Israel Friendship League's Partners for Democracy award in 2010, for her contribution to promoting the economies of Israel and the United States.

Business activities
Arison owns or is active in various businesses and philanthropic organizations, including:
 Arison Investments
 The Ted Arison Family Foundation
 Bank Hapoalim 
 Shikun & Binui 
 Goodnet.org — an online media publication featuring "Good News" stories

Personal life
Arison has been married and divorced three times. Her first husband was Jose Antonio Sueiras, an officer on one of the ships owned by her father; they had three children. Her second husband was basketball player Miki Dorsman; they had one child. Her third husband was Ofer Glazer.

See also
 Arison family

References

External links
 Official website 
 

1957 births
Living people
American businesspeople in shipping
Israeli businesspeople in shipping
American billionaires
American emigrants to Israel
American people of Israeli descent
American women in business
Businesspeople from New York (state)
Female billionaires
Israeli bankers
Israeli billionaires
Israeli philanthropists
21st-century Israeli businesswomen
21st-century Israeli businesspeople
Jewish women philanthropists
Jewish American philanthropists
21st-century American Jews
21st-century American women
21st-century Israeli Jews